Ronald Snapper served as secretary of the Inter-territorial Organization for Eurafrican Organizations in Rhodesia, now known as Zimbabwe.

References

Rhodesian politicians
Year of birth missing
Year of death missing